The 2021 Club Atlético Boca Juniors season is the 93rd consecutive Primera División season for the senior squad. It is an unusual season, due to the ongoing COVID-19 pandemic in the country. The Primera Division tournament will return after two national cups were played. Boca Juniors also took part in the Copa Argentina, and in the Final stages of the 2021 Copa Libertadores.

Season overview

June 
Marcelo Weigandt and Nazareno Solís returned from their respective loans. On June 3, Boca and Mauro Zárate agreed to mutually terminate the forward's contract, Zárate subsequently joined América Mineiro. On June 4, Boca and Carlos Tevez agreed to mutually terminate the forward's contract, Tevez subsequently joined ; In a press conference, Tevez said that he was "physically fit to continue but not mentally" and that he can continue to play "at the age of 42, but not in Boca Juniors". Tevez won in the club 11 titles and played 279 matches. On June 11, Nicolás Orsini arrives from Lanús. On June 17, Norberto Briasco and Esteban Rolón arrived from Huracán. On June 23, Nicolás Capaldo was transferred to Red Bull Salzburg from Austria. Franco Soldano ended his loan with Boca and returned to his club.

July 
Emmanuel Mas, Julio Buffarini and Leonardo Jara ended their contract with the club. On July 4, Esteban Andrada was transferred to Monterrey from Mexico. On July 13 Boca drew 0-0 against Brazilian Atlético Mineiro in Copa Libertadores. On the first match of Primera Division Boca drew 1-1 against Union. After another 0-0 draw against Atletico Mineiro Boca lost on penalties and was eliminated of Copa Libertadores. Gonzalo Maroni is loaned to Atlas. On July 24 Boca drew 0-0 against Banfield. On July 27 Boca lost 2-0 against San Lorenzo. On July 30 Juan Ramírez arrives from San Lorenzo. On July 31 Luis Advíncula arrives from Rayo Vallecano.

August 
On August 1 Boca drew 0-0 against Talleres (C). On August 4 after a 0-0 draw Boca eliminated classic rival River Plate, winning 4-1 in penalties. On August 8 Boca drew 1-1 against Argentinos Juniors. Ramón Ábila interrupts the loan in Minnesota United, and is loaned to D.C. United. On August 15 Boca lost 1-0 against Estudiantes (LP). On August 17 Miguel Ángel Russo is sacked and Sebastián Battaglia is appointed as new manager. On August 21 Boca defeated Patronato 1-0. On August 25 Boca defeated Platense 3-1. On August 29 Boca drew 0-0 against Racing.

September 
On September 4 Boca defeated Rosario Central 2-1. On September 14 Boca drew 0-0 against Defensa y Justicia. On September 18 Boca defeated Atlético Tucumán 2-1. On September 22 Boca advanced to the semifinals of Copa Argentina after eliminating Patronato on penalties. On September 26 Boca defeated Colón 1-0.

October 
On October 3 Boca lost the Superclásico 2-0 against River Plate. On October 9 Boca defeated Lanús 4-2. On October 16 Boca defeated Huracán 3-0. On October 20 Boca defeated Godoy Cruz 2-1. On October 24 Boca lost 2-0 against Vélez Sarsfield. On October 30 Boca lost 1-0 against Gimnasia y Esgrima (LP).

November 
On November 3 Boca defeated Argentinos Juniors 1-0 and advanced to Copa Argentina final. On November 8 Boca defeated Aldosivi 3-0. On November 19 Boca defeated Sarmiento (J) 2-0. On November 24 Boca lost 1-0 against Independiente. On November 30 Boca drew 0-0 against Newell's Old Boys.

December 
On December 4 Boca drew 1-1 against Arsenal. On December 8, Boca won their 4th and record title of Copa Argentina after defeating Talleres (C) 5-4 on penalties after a 0-0 draw and qualified to the group stage of 2022 Copa Libertadores. In the last match of the league tournament on December 11, Boca defeated 8-1 Central Córdoba (SdE).

Current squad

Last updated on December 12, 2021.

Transfers

Winter

In

Out

Competitions

Overall

1: The Round of 64 and Round of 32 were played in the previous season.
2: The group stage of 2021 Copa Libertadores was played in the previous season.

Primera División

League table

International Qualification

Relegation table

Results summary

Results by round

Matches

Copa Argentina

Round of 16

Quarterfinals

Semifinals

Final

2021 Copa Libertadores

Final Stages

Team statistics

Season Appearances and goals

|-
! colspan="14" style="background:#00009B; color:gold; text-align:center"| Goalkeepers

|-
! colspan="14" style="background:#00009B; color:gold; text-align:center"| Defenders

|-
! colspan="16" style="background:#00009B; color:gold; text-align:center"| Midfielder

|-
! colspan="16" style="background:#00009B; color:gold; text-align:center"| Forwards

|-
! colspan="14" style="background:#00009B; color:gold; text-align:center"| Players who have made an appearance or had a squad number this season, but have left the club

|}

Top scorers

Top assists

Penalties

Clean sheets

Disciplinary record

Notes

References

External links
 Club Atlético Boca Juniors official web site 

Club Atlético Boca Juniors seasons
2021 in Argentine football